The Saussure's long-nosed bats or Mexican long-nosed bats form the genus Leptonycteris within the leaf-nosed bat family Phyllostomidae.  Like all members of the family, they are native to the Americas.  According to ITIS, three species are currently recognised, though varying placements of the populations into species and subspecies will be encountered.  The species recognised by ITIS are:

Southern long-nosed bat, Leptonycteris curasoae   
Greater long-nosed bat or Mexican long-nosed bat, Leptonycteris nivalis
Lesser long-nosed bat or Mexican long-nosed bat, Leptonycteris yerbabuenae.

In view of the thorough ambiguity of the term "Mexican long-nosed bat", which can refer to the genus or to either of two of its species, the alternative common names are preferable.

These migratory bats are the main pollinators of several nocturnal blooming cactus species.

See also
Bats of the United States

References

Phyllostomidae
Bats of North America
Bats of Central America
Bats of South America
Bats of Brazil
Bats of Mexico
Bats of the United States
Taxa named by Richard Lydekker